Wilton Friary was a friary in Wiltshire, England.

Monasteries in Wiltshire